The Coen River is a river located in the Cape York Peninsula in Queensland, Australia. 

The headwaters of the river rise at the confluence of Pandanus Creek and an unnamed creek near Bend along the Peninsula Developmental Road in the Great Dividing Range. The river flows in an easterly direction crossing the Peninsula Developmental Road at Coen then veering north east through mostly uninhabited country including Mungkan Kandju National Park then heading east and eventually discharging into the Archer River. The Coen River is a tributary of the Archer river and was for a time known as the South Coen River.

The present (1996) Pennefather River (renamed 1894) was originally called the Coen River by Jan Carstenszoon in honour of Jan Pieterszoon Coen, Governor-General of the Dutch East Indies. The present Archer River was probably confused by Matthew Flinders with Carstenszoon's Coen River.

See also

References

Rivers of Far North Queensland